Progresso is an unincorporated community in Torrance County, New Mexico, United States. Most of the community (approximately 990 acres) is private property. The only remaining building is the old school house. Nearby towns include Willard and Cedarvale. Many ranches and farms are located near Progresso. Ownership of Progresso and surrounding property has been in the Velasquez and Maes families since the early 1900s. Current ownership is held by Progresso Holdings LLC.

Unincorporated communities in Torrance County, New Mexico
Unincorporated communities in New Mexico
Albuquerque metropolitan area